Juan Ravenet, or Giovanni Ravenet (1766, Sala Baganza - c.1821, Madrid) was an Italian painter and engraver of French ancestry who received his education in  Parma. He is primarily known for participating in the Malaspina Expedition.

Biography
His father was the French-born engraver, Gian Francesco Ravenet (originally), who worked for the Duchy of Parma. His grandfather, Simon François Ravenet, was also a well-known engraver. He studied at the Accademia di Belle Arti di Parma, where he stood out as a portraitist. 

Together with the painter, Fernando Brambila, he joined the scientific mission led by Alejandro Malaspina in Acapulco in 1791. He was commissioned to paint portraits of the people they encountered and scenes from daily life. Upon completing the mission, he remained in Spain, as part of his contract; continuing to produce drawings and engravings for the Royal Court. 

After Malaspina fell out of favor, he lost his position and suffered financial problems, but was able to support himself by working for the Spanish Navy. During the Peninsular War, his loyalties were questioned because of his French origins and he had to take refuge in France. He later returned to Madrid and died there; probably in 1821. His works from the expedition were not published until many years after his death.

References

Further reading
 Carmen Sotos Serrano, Los Pintores de la Expedición de Alejandro Malaspina, Real Academia de la Historia, 1982

External links

1766 births
1821 deaths
Italian engravers
Artists from Parma